Manda Cingi (born 29 May 1993), is an Indonesian professional footballer who plays as a midfielder for Liga 1 club PSS Sleman.

Honours

Club 
Semen Padang
 Liga 2 runner-up: 2018

References

External links
 Manda Cingi at Soccerway
 Manda Cingi at Liga Indonesia

1993 births
Living people
Indonesian footballers
Association football midfielders
Indonesian Premier Division players
Liga 1 (Indonesia) players
Liga 2 (Indonesia) players
PPSM Magelang players
Sriwijaya F.C. players
Semen Padang F.C. players
Badak Lampung F.C. players
PSM Makassar players
PSS Sleman players
People from Bandar Lampung
Sportspeople from Lampung